The 1916 Utah gubernatorial election was held on November 7, 1916. Democratic nominee Simon Bamberger defeated Republican nominee Nephi L. Morris with 55.12% of the vote. It was the first time a Democrat was elected governor of the state.

General election

Candidates
Major party candidates
Simon Bamberger, Democratic
Nephi L. Morris, Republican 

Other candidates
F. M. McHugh, Socialist

Results

References

1916
Utah
Gubernatorial